Conduct Zero (also known as No Manners) is a 2002 South Korean film directed by Joh Keun-shik.

Plot
Joong-pil is the undisputed "king" of his high school due to his fighting skills. His life as a delinquent is comfortable until he falls in love with Min-hee, a pretty girl from a neighbouring school, and is challenged by Sang-man, a tough new student. Min-hee also faces competition from Na-young, leader of the "Five Princesses Gang", who has a crush on Joong-pil.

Cast
 Ryoo Seung-bum ... Joong-pil
 Lim Eun-kyung ... Min-hee
 Gong Hyo-jin ... Na-young
 Kim Kwang-il ... Sang-man
 Bong Tae-gyu ... Soo-dong

References

External links
 
 
 
 Conduct Zero Review at Koreanfilm.org
 Conduct Zero Review at DVD Verdict

2002 films
2000s Korean-language films
Taekwondo films
South Korean comedy films
2000s South Korean films